Kodayanchi is the village located next to Vaniyambadi, Vellore district, Tamil Nadu, India.

References 

Villages in Vellore district